In environmental science, the concept of overshoot means demand in excess of regeneration. It can apply to animal populations and people. Environmental science studies to what extent human populations through their resource consumption have risen above the sustainable use of resources. For people, "overshoot" is that portion of their demand or ecological footprint which must be eliminated to be sustainable. Excessive demand leading to overshoot is driven by both consumption and population.

A decline in population as a consequence of overshoot has been termed 'collapse'. The trajectory undergone by such a population has been called 'overshoot-and-collapse'. A collapse, as much as overshoot, can be the result of different conditions, a particular but not synonymous case of collapse is the Malthusian catastrophe.

Overshoot can occur due to lag effects. Reproduction rates may remain high relative to the death rate. Entire ecosystems may be severely affected and sometimes reduced to less-complex states due to prolonged overshoot.  The eradication of disease can trigger overshoot when a population suddenly exceeds the land's carrying capacity. An example of this occurred on the Horn of Africa when smallpox was eliminated. A region that had supported around 1 million pastoralists for centuries was suddenly expected to support 14 million people. The result was overgrazing, which led to soil erosion.

Human overshoot

 The 1972 book The Limits to Growth discussed the limits to growth of society as a whole. This book included a computer-based model which predicted that the Earth would reach a carrying capacity of ten to fourteen billion people after some two hundred years, after which the human population would collapse. The model was based on five variables: "population, food production, industrialization, pollution, and consumption of non-renewable natural resources". This simulation modelled human populations after the overshoot and collapse seen in all unmoderated species. It was highly controversial and generally dismissed by economists.

William R. Catton, Jr., a sociologist, wrote about relationships between human societies and their environment, as well as his beliefs that there were too many people and more needed to die, in his 1980 book Overshoot: The Ecological Basis of Revolutionary Change. He wrote that humanity would overshoot Earth's carrying capacity, due to both overpopulation and overconsumption.

The Global Footprint Network purports to be able to measure how much the human economy demands against what the Earth can renew. The Optimum Population Trust (now called Population Matters) has listed what they believe is the overshoot (overpopulation) of a number of countries, based on the above.

A widely discussed study published in January 2021 in Frontiers in Conservation Science, emphasizes the significance of overshoot stating that "simultaneous with population growth, humanity's consumption as a fraction of Earth's regenerative capacity has grown from ~ 73% in 1960 to 170% in 2016, with substantially greater per-person consumption in countries with highest income." These numbers are based on recent Ecological Footprint studies. The Frontiers in Conservation Science publication explains that "[t]his massive ecological overshoot is largely enabled by the increasing use of fossil fuels. These convenient fuels have allowed us to decouple human demand from biological regeneration: 85% of commercial energy, 65% of fibers, and most plastics are now produced from fossil fuels."

As a possible cause for societal collapse, overshoot has been scholarly discussed, but has not been found having been the cause for historic cases of collapse.

Predictions of scarcity

In his 1798 work An Essay on the Principle of Population, the British scholar Thomas Malthus incorrectly predicted that continued population growth would exhaust the global food supply by the mid-19th century. Malthus wrote the essay to refute what he considered the unattainable utopian ideas of William Godwin and Marquis de Condorcet, as presented in Political Justice and The Future Progress of the Human Mind. In 1968, Paul R. Ehrlich reprised Malthus' argument in The Population Bomb, predicting that mass global famine would occur in the 1970s and 1980s.

The predictions of Ehrlich and other neo-Malthusians were vigorously challenged by a number of economists, notably Julian Lincoln Simon, and advances in agriculture, collectively known as the Green Revolution, forestalled any potential global famine in the late 20th century. Between 1950 and 1984, as the Green Revolution transformed agriculture around the world, grain production increased by over 250%. The world population has grown by over four billion since the beginning of the Green Revolution, but food production has so far kept pace with population growth. Most scholars believe that, without the Revolution, there would be greater levels of famine and malnutrition than the UN presently documents. However, neo-Malthusians point out that fossil fuels provided the energy for the Green Revolution, in the form of natural gas-derived fertilizers, oil-derived pesticides, and hydrocarbon-fueled irrigation, and that many crops have become so genetically uniform that a crop failure in any one country could potentially have global repercussions.

In May 2008, the price of grain was pushed up severely by the increased cultivation of biofuels, the increase of world oil prices to over $140 per barrel ($880/m3), global population growth, the effects of climate change, the loss of agricultural land to residential and industrial development, and growing consumer demand in the population centres of China and India. Food riots subsequently occurred in some countries. However, oil prices then fell sharply. Resource demands are expected to ease as population growth declines, but it is unclear whether mass food wastage and rising living standards in developing countries will once again create resource shortages.

David Pimentel, professor of ecology and agriculture at Cornell University, estimates that the sustainable agricultural carrying capacity for the United States is about 200 million people; its population as of 2015 is over 300 million. In 2009, the UK government's chief scientific advisor, Professor John Beddington, warned that growing populations, falling energy reserves and food shortages would create a "perfect storm" of shortages of food, water, and energy by 2030. According to a 2009 report by the United Nations Food and Agriculture Organization (FAO), the world will have to produce 70% more food by 2050 to feed a projected extra 2.3 billion people.

The observed figures for 2007 showed an actual increase in absolute numbers of undernourished people in the world, with 923 million undernourished in 2007, versus 832 million in 1995. The 2009 FAO estimates showed an even more dramatic increase, to 1.02 billion.

Human impact on the environment

A number of scientists have argued that the looming human impact on the environment and accompanying increase in resource consumption threatens the world's ecosystem and the survival of human civilization. Scientists contend that continued human population growth and overconsumption, particularly by the wealthy, are the primary drivers of mass species extinction and some suggesting human overpopulation as a driver.

Human population planning

Human population planning is the practice of intervening to alter the rate of population growth. Historically, human population control has been implemented by limiting a region's birth rate, by voluntary contraception or by government mandate. It has been undertaken as a response to factors including high or increasing levels of poverty, environmental concerns, and religious reasons. The use of abortion in some population control strategies has caused controversy, with religious organizations such as the Roman Catholic Church explicitly opposing any intervention in the human reproductive process.

The University of Nebraska publication Green Illusions argues that population control to alleviate environmental pressures need not be coercive. It states that "Women who are educated, economically engaged, and in control of their own bodies can enjoy the freedom of bearing children at their own pace, which happens to be a rate that is appropriate for the aggregate ecological endowment of our planet." The book Fatal Misconception by Matthew Connelly similarly points to the importance of supporting the rights of women in bringing population levels down over time. Paul Ehrlich also advocates making "modern contraception and back-up abortion available to all and give women full equal rights, pay and opportunities with men," noting that it could possibly "lead to a low enough total fertility rate that the needed shrinkage of population would follow. [But] it will take a very long time to humanely reduce total population to a size that is sustainable." Ehrlich places the optimum global population size at 1.5 to 2 billion people.

Other academicians and public figures have pointed to the role of agriculture and agricultural productivity of increasing human carrying capacity, which results in population overshoot, as with any other species when their food supply experiences an increase, which in turn results in resource depletion and mass poverty and starvation in the case of humans.

See also

Overconsumption
Earth Overshoot Day
Ecological overshoot
Planetary boundaries
Planetary management
Malthusianism
Food race

References

Further reading
The Population Bomb, by Paul R. Ehrlich

External links 

EarthOvershoot.org

Population ecology
Ecology terminology
Human overpopulation
Environmental social science concepts